2A3 may refer to:

 2A3 Kondensator 2P, a Soviet self-propelled Howitzer
 Larsen Bay Airport, Alaska — FAA LID code: 2A3
 Bessemer Airport, Alabama — former FAA LID code: 2A3
 a Power triode commonly used in Single-ended triode (SET) amplifiers